The 1976–77 Yorkshire Football League was the 51st season in the history of the Yorkshire Football League, a football competition in England.

Division One

Division One featured 12 clubs which competed in the previous season, along with four new clubs, promoted from Division Two:
Denaby United
Guiseley
Leeds Ashley Road
Liversedge

League table

Map

Division Two

Division Two featured eight clubs which competed in the previous season, along with eight new clubs.
Clubs relegated from Division One:
Farsley Celtic
Frecheville Community Association
Maltby Miners Welfare
Worsbrough Bridge Miners Welfare Athletic
Clubs promoted from Division Three:
Ossett Town
Rawmarsh Welfare
Scarborough reserves
Sheffield

League table

Map

Division Three

Division Three featured eleven clubs which competed in the previous season, along with five new clubs.
Clubs relegated from Division Two:
Bentley Victoria Welfare
Hall Road Rangers
Stocksbridge Works
Plus:
Fryston Colliery Welfare
Pilkington Recreation

League table

Map

League Cup

Final

References

1976–77 in English football leagues
Yorkshire Football League